Aberdeen station may refer to:

 Aberdeen bus station, bus station in Aberdeen, Scotland
 Aberdeen Lifeboat Station, a Royal National Lifeboat Institution (RNLI) marine-rescue facility
 Aberdeen station (Maryland), an Amtrak and MARC station in Aberdeen, Maryland, United States
 Aberdeen station (Baltimore and Ohio Railroad), a former station in Aberdeen, Maryland, United States
 Aberdeen station (South Dakota), a former station in Aberdeen, South Dakota, United States
 Aberdeen station (Minneapolis and St. Louis Railway), a former station in Aberdeen, South Dakota, United States
 Aberdeen station (Milwaukee Road), a former station in Aberdeen, South Dakota, United States
 Aberdeen station (Baltimore and Ohio Railroad), a former station in Aberdeen, Maryland, United States
 Aberdeen railway station, the current main railway station of Aberdeen, Scotland, UK
 Aberdeen railway station, New South Wales, a railway station in Australia
 Aberdeen station (SkyTrain), a rapid transit station in Richmond, British Columbia, Canada
 Aberdeen station (MTR), a future rapid transit station in Hong Kong
 Aberdeen-Matawan station, a station on New Jersey Transit's North Jersey Coast Line
 Railway stations of Aberdeen, a list of historical railway stations in Aberdeen, Scotland, UK

See also 
 Aberdeen (disambiguation)